Ishwar is a South Asian name.

Notable people with the name include:

 Ishwar Ballav (1937–2008), Nepali poet
 Ishwar Chaudhary (born 1988), Indian cricketer
 Ishwar Dass Dhiman (1934–2016), Indian politician
 Ishwar Chandra Gupta (1812–1859), Indian Bengali poet and writer
 Ishwar C. Harris  (born 1943), Indian scholar of religion
 Ishwar Maraj (born 1969), Trinidadian-Canadian cricketer
 Ishwar Dayal Mishra, Nepalese politician
 Ishwar Modi (born 1940), Indian sociologist 
 Ishwar Chand Nanda (1892–1965), Indian dramatist
 Ishwar Pandey (born 1989), Indian cricketer
 Ishwar Petlikar (1916–1983), Indian Gujarati-language author and journalist
 Ishwar Pokhrel (born 1954), Nepalese leader of the Communist Party of Nepal 
 Ishwar Puri (born 1959), Indian-born scientist, engineer, and academic who has worked in the United States and Canada
 Ishwar Das Rohani (1946–2013), Indian politician 
 Ishwar Singh (born 1950), Indian politician
 Ishwar Dayal Swami (1929–2019), Indian politician
 Ishwar Das Varshnei (died 1948), Indian glass worker and industrialist
 Ishwar Chandra Vidyasagar (1820–1891), Indian Bengali polymath
 Chaudhary Ishwar Singh, Indian politician

Surname
 Reeta Ishwar, Pakistani politician

See also
 Ishwar Gupta Setu, a bridge that crosses the Hooghly River in West Bengal, India
 Ishvara